Metapenaeopsis commensalis is a species of crustacean in the family Penaeidae first described by Lancelot Alexander Borradaile in 1898.

References 

Penaeidae
Crustaceans described in 1898